Tasius is the name given by Strabo to the king of the Rhoxolani, a Sarmatian tribal group. Around 100 BCE, Tasius led an invasion of Crimea in support of the Scythian warlord Palacus. He was defeated by the Pontian general Diophantus.

Ancient Crimea
Sarmatian rulers
2nd-century BC Iranian people